Dudsday, also Duds' day, or Dud's day was a hiring fair, a holiday, held at Kilmarnock in East Ayrshire, Scotland. Originally held at Martinmas that falls on November 11 it was later also held at Whitsun. At this fair farm labourers would be hired.

History

The fair's name comes from the custom of farm Labourers purchasing new clothes or duds (from the Middle English word dudde, a cloak) having been paid their wages for the previous half-year.

Later the name was applied to the spring hiring fair at Whitsun in Kilmarnock also and to other similar fairs held in other parts of Ayrshire for the same purpose. The Kilmarnock Dudsday ceased to be held after 1939, the name previously becoming also attached to hiring markets set at other dates than the traditional Dudsday.

These fairs were eagerly looked forward to by merchants and were especially busy for the shopkeepers and the taverns. Farm labourers hoped to either renew or gain better employment at these Dudsday fairs. The 'Ayr Advertiser' for 21 October 1920 records of a hiring event that "There were not a great many single men engaged, a large proportion of them preferring to wait till Dudd's Day."

Archibald McKay in his 1880 'History of Kilmarnock' makes mention of several fairs such as 'Fastern's E'en' (Shrove Tuesday) but gives no reference to Dudsday or any tradition of hiring fairs.

Hirings
One general report for hiring fairs states that

The Murder of James Young

The fact that Dudsday meant that farm labourers were guaranteed to be visiting Kilmarnock in large numbers with money in their pockets attracted pick-pockets and worse. In 1848 a young farm servant from Fortacres Farm near Gatehead was murdered by James McWheelan whilst returning from the Kilmarnock 'Dudd's-day' (sic). James had fifteen shillings in silver and a silver watch, both of which were stolen and the victim being knocked unconscious with a boulder and then stabbed in the neck with a carpenter's chisel. The murderer was caught near Paisley and hung after a trial at Ayr.

Such was the notoriety of the murder and sympathy for the victim that passers by took to leaving a stone at the spot to create a cairn (NS 39979 34140) that grew to a fairly considerable size. The cairn is no longer apparent as the site has attracted random dumping of various materials over the years.

Adamson's comment in his 'Rambles Round Kilmarnock' was that the ".. marks the spot where one of the most cold-blooded and heartless murders that ever stained the annals of our country."

See also
Riccarton, Ayrshire
Kilmarnock

References 
Notes

Sources

 Adamson, Archibald R. (1875). Rambles Round Kilmarnock. Kilmarnock : T. Stevenson. 
 Crofton, Ian. A Dictionary of Scottish Phrase and Fable.
 Kellie, John (2013). Ayrshire Echoes. Auchinleck : Carn Publishing. .
 McKay, Archibald (1880). The History of Kilmarnock. Kilmarnock : Archibald McKay.
 Percy, Reuben & Timbs, John (1834). The Mirror of Literature, Amusement, and Instruction, Volume 23.

External links
  Commentary and video on the murder of James Young.

Murder of James Young
History of East Ayrshire
Kilmarnock
Fairs in Scotland
Folk festivals in Scotland